"The Question" is the second single by Concept of One from the album of the same name, released in 1990 with the participation of freestyle singer Noel Pagan. Although the song only achieved moderate success on the charts entering only the dance singles chart, the song became one of Noel's most popular, where he still includes it in his live shows.

Track listing
 US 12" single

 US CD maxi-single

Charts

References

1990 singles
Noel Pagan songs
Concept of One songs
1990 songs
Song articles with missing songwriters